Center for Justice & Democracy (CJ&D) is a non-profit consumer rights organization exclusively dedicated to educating the public about the importance of the U.S. civil justice system and fighting tort reform.

Organization and history 

The Center for Justice & Democracy was founded in 1998 by former Ralph Nader staff attorney Joanne Doroshow, with the help of other consumer advocates, including Mr. Nader. In November 2011, New York Law School and the Center for Justice and Democracy formed an affiliation to begin during the fall 2011 semester; during this affiliation CJ&D will be known as the Center for Justice and Democracy at New York Law School.

CJ&D has published numerous studies and White Papers as well as fact sheets on a variety of civil justice issues. CJ&D has presented testimony before Congress and state legislatures, and has helped organize press events advocating the rights of injured consumers and patients.

Additional projects 
Americans For Insurance Reform (AIR)
ThePopTort
BP Justice Now
Civil Justice Resource Group (CJRG)

Non-profit organizations based in New York City
Consumer organizations in the United States
Organizations established in 1998